The Big Arvo, originally titled The Big Breakfast, was an Australian television program that was broadcast on the Seven Network from 1999 until 2005. It began in a morning time slot under the name of The Big Breakfast, before moving to the afternoon to make way for AMV: All Music Video and Sunrise. The program was presented by four hosts, who hosted the show in a large model bus. The program included segments such as "cool job" and "dare" to amuse younger viewers and to teach viewers who had outgrown Play School. It appeared in K-Zone magazine to celebrate 500 episodes.

Hosts

 

 Notes

 There is a 7-month gap between Curtis Fernandez being replaced by Luke Jacobz as The Big Breakfast went off air during this time before being resurrected as The Big Arvo
 There is a 5-month gap between Anna Choy being replaced by James Tobin as The Big Arvo was off air during this time, replaced by Girl TV
 James Tobin was credited as "Jesse Tobin" for all episodes
 Ben and Jenny were the only two hosts to remain with the show for its entire run

Programmes

Cartoons
Here is a list of cartoons that were shown as part of The Big Breakfast:

 Mummies Alive!
 Pancho and Rancho
 Johnny Bravo
 Tom and Jerry
 The Flintstones
 Sherlock Holmes in the 22nd Century
 Sonic Underground
 ReBoot
 Ed, Edd n Eddy
 The Bots Master
 Dexter's Laboratory
 The Legend of Prince Valiant
 Life with Louie
 The Powerpuff Girls
 I am Weasel
 Gargoyles
 Gargoyles: The Goliath Chronicles
 Sailor Moon (original DIC Dub)
 Cow and Chicken
 The New Adventures of Flash Gordon
 The Mask
 The Jetsons
 Basket Fever
 All Dogs Go to Heaven: The Series
 Star Trek: The Animated Series
 Richie Rich
 The Pirates of Dark Water
 Teenage Mutant Ninja Turtles
 Beast Wars: Transformers
 BattleTech: The Animated Series

Live-action
The Big Breakfast has also aired a few live action programmes:
 S Club 7 in Miami

See also

 List of Australian television series

References

External links 
 

Australian children's television series
Seven Network original programming
Television shows set in New South Wales
1999 Australian television series debuts
2005 Australian television series endings
English-language television shows